Debit and Credit is a 1924 German silent drama film directed by Carl Wilhelm and starring Hans Brausewetter, Mady Christians, and Theodor Loos. It is based on the 1855 novel Debit and Credit.

The film's art direction was by Robert A. Dietrich.

Cast

References

Bibliography

External links

1924 films
Films of the Weimar Republic
Films directed by Carl Wilhelm
German silent feature films
Films set in the 19th century
Films based on German novels
German black-and-white films
1920s historical drama films
German historical drama films
Terra Film films
German drama films
Silent drama films
1920s German films